Daisy Beaumont (born 5 May 1974) is an English actress.

Career
Beaumont's television work includes a variety of shows, among others The Border, EastEnders, Hotel Babylon, A Touch of Cloth, Agatha Christie's Poirot, Mumbai Calling and The Bill as well as a small role in the Jackie Chan & Owen Wilson film Shanghai Nights.

In January 2013, she appeared in the ITV comedy drama series Great Night Out as Zoe, and in September 2013 she played the part of Stella Knight in the ITV drama Whitechapel.

In October 2014, she appeared in the eighth episode of the eighth series of the BBC sci-fi series Doctor Who, playing the role of Maisie Pitt in the story Mummy on the Orient Express.

Filmography

Film

Television

References

External links

Living people
Actresses from London
1974 births
English stage actresses
English soap opera actresses
English television actresses
English film actresses
20th-century English actresses
21st-century English actresses